Radical 151 or radical bean meaning "bean" is one of the 214 Kangxi radicals.  It is one of 20 which are composed of 7 strokes.

In the Kangxi Dictionary, there are 68 characters (out of 49,030) to be found under this radical.

 is also the 152nd indexing component in the Table of Indexing Chinese Character Components predominantly adopted by Simplified Chinese dictionaries published in mainland China.

Evolution

Derived characters

Literature

External links

Unihan Database - U+8C46

151
152